Casearia is a plant genus in the family Salicaceae. The genus was included in the Flacourtiaceae under the Cronquist system of angiosperm classification, and earlier in the Samydaceae.

They are sometimes employed as honey plants, notably C. decandra and C. sylvestris. The latter species is occasionally used as food by the caterpillars of the two-barred flasher (Astraptes fulgerator). Several species are becoming rare due to deforestation. Some appear close to extinction, and C. quinduensis of Colombia and C. tinifolia from Mauritius seem to be extinct since some time in the 20th century and about 1976, respectively.

Selected species

 Names brought to synonymy
 Casearia elegans Standley, a synonym for Casearia bartlettii

References

External links

 
Taxonomy articles created by Polbot
Salicaceae genera
Taxa named by Nikolaus Joseph von Jacquin